Richards is a suburb of Sydney, in the state of New South Wales, Australia. Richards is located north-west of Sydney City in the local government area of Blacktown.

History 
Richards is situated in the Darug traditional Aboriginal country. Richards was approved as a suburb on 7 September 2020 and gazetted on 6 November 2020. Prior to the suburb's creation, the area was part of Riverstone and Vineyard.

The origin of the suburb name is from Benjamin Richards who established an abattoir in the area, in 1878.

References 

Suburbs of Sydney
City of Blacktown